John Clifford Hall (26 June 1925 – 25 March 2001) was an English playwright who wrote over thirty plays for theatre, television and radio.

Biography
Hall was educated at Queens College, Oxford, where he studied under C. S. Lewis. Study for his MA was interrupted by service in the RNVR.  For this he studied Japanese and worked in Intelligence at Bletchley Park.

His first produced play World Behind Your Back, was in collaboration with actor William Eedle, at the Mercury Theatre in London in 1952.

Albert Finney starred in one of his most successful plays The Lizard on the Rock, at Birmingham Repertory Theatre of which Michael Billington wrote: 'Above all, I remember him [Finney] in The Lizard on the Rock by John Hall, which required him to be shot at point-blank range in the stomach: as he suddenly crumpled, uttering cat-like cries, the critic Kenneth Tynan in The Observer described it as "the best fall since Feuillère", who was then queen of the French stage'.

The Lizard on the Rock was well-received. It is a story based around '...an industrialist – a Senator – who is prospecting for water...' '...in the Western Australian desert... the central character [is] outwardly a man of success and power, but faced with the collapse of his achievements...' and the realisation that 'Life cannot depend upon "the blandishments of power; the blind man groping among the useless treasure.'"

Sir John Gielgud was quoted as saying that the play contained 'a great deal of power and originality'. and the playwright Christopher Fry wrote: 'Mr Hall's mind is his own; what he has to say is his own...' The review in The Stage for the Birmingham production of the play read: 'an interesting journey through a variety of tense scenes, each peopled with characters that might in turn be the focal point of the play themselves... Mr. Hall... gives them an aura pregnant with possibilities.' The International Theatre Annual described the blank verse in The Lizard on the Rock as 'Eliotesque'.

Hall wrote his play Exit, Joe, Running influenced by 'the marked contrasts of life at Oxford... and Keele [Universities]... The leading character – within a few months of leaving academia – writes a paper titled "39 Reasons Why University Is No Good"'.

Hall considered the most important playwrights of the 1960s were '...Harold Pinter, Christopher Fry, Robert Bolt, John Arden, John Osborne, Arnold Wesker, Peter Schaeffer and Charles Wood'. He was influenced by Christopher Fry during the resurrection of verse drama, and by Anton Chekhov. One of his own favourite plays was Everly, which never got beyond a rehearsed reading. Wrang-Gaites, written for his sons to enjoy, was originally performed by the York Theatre Royal Activists in 1973 and was later set to music at Chichester University. Of Wrang-Gaites, playwright Christopher Fry wrote: 'It is as though the traditional Mummer's Play of St George and the Dragon had spread and ramified and leapt into the twentieth century.'

Works

Stage plays
 1957    The Strangers  –  Bristol Old Vic
 1957    The Lizard on the Rock –  With Albert Finney (Augsberg theatre and Birmingham repertory company)
 1958    The Holiday  –  No 1 tour with Sylvia Syms, Sian Phillips and Peter O’Toole
 1959    The Net  –  Harrogate Opera House
 1959    A Pennyworth of Love   –  Northampton Rep. theatre
 1962    The Lizard on the Rock  –  tour and London Phoenix theatre with Sian Phillips, John Laurie and Harry Andrews
 1963    I, John Brown  –  with Sir Ian McKellen, Ipswich Arts theatre
 1965    Convolvulus  –  Theatre Royal, Windsor
 1966    The Little Woman  –  Traverse theatre, Edinburgh
 1973    Bondi's Dream  –  Pool Theatre, Edinburgh
 1973    Alva the Widow  –  Netherbow, Edinburgh
 1974    Grass and Sky  –  Strathclyde University theatre group
 1976    Skin and Bones  –  Aberdeen University
 1976    Wrang-Gaites  –  York and Aberdeen student productions
 1977    Everly  –  workshop production for Scottish society of playwrights
 1978    Any Horse looks Fast Going Past Trees  –  Lyceum. Edinburgh

Television plays
 1961    The Break-Up, starring Rosalie Crutchley and James Donald  –  Play of the Week, ITV
 1963    The Swindler  –  Armchair theatre, ABC TV
 1964    Exit Joe, Running, starring Tim Preece  –  Armchair theatre, ABC TV
 1984    Movie Queen, with Toyah Wilcox and Annie Ross –  HTV
 1985    Child Marlene  –  BBC2, Thirty Minute Theatre
 1986    The Proposal  –  ITV, Love Story series

Radio plays
 1982    Chrissie  –  Radio 4
 1983    Jackie  –  Radio 4, Saturday Night theatre
 1985    The Gaudy  –  Radio 3
 1985    In the Venn Country  –  Radio 4
 1986    Breakfast at Mother Brown's  –  Radio 4          
 1987    The Bridge  –  Radio 4
 1988    The Little House  –  Radio 3
 1989    The Wedding of Jackie  –  Radio 4

References

External links 

 John Hall Papers at Columbia University
 John Hall Collection at the Harry Ransom Center

1925 births
2001 deaths